uMgungundlovu is one of the 11 district municipalities ("districts") of KwaZulu-Natal province. The seat of uMgungundlovu is Pietermaritzburg. The majority of its 1 million+ residents speak Zulu (2001 Census). The district code is DC22

Geography

Neighbours
uMgungundlovu is surrounded by:
 eThekwini to the southeast (Durban)
 iLembe to the east (DC29)
 Sisonke to the southwest (DC43)
 Ugu to the south (DC21)
 Umzinyathi to the north (DC24)
 Uthukela to the northwest (DC23)

Local municipalities
The district contains the following local municipalities:

Demographics
The following statistics are from the 2011 census.

Gender

Ethnic group

Age

Politics

Election results
Election results for Umgungundlovu in the South African general election, 2004. 
 Population 18 and over: 575 772 [62.06% of total population]
 Total votes: 280 991 [30.28% of total population]
 Voting % estimate: 48.80% votes as a % of population 18 and over

See also
 Municipal Demarcation Board

References

External links 
 Umgungundlovu DM Official Website (under construction)

District Municipalities of KwaZulu-Natal